Eiwaz or Eihaz is the reconstructed Proto-Germanic name of the rune , coming from a word for "yew". The latter is possibly an early loan from the Celtic, compare Gaulish ivos, Breton ivin, Welsh ywen, Old Irish ēo. The common spelling of the rune's name, "Eihwaz", combines the two variants; strictly based on the Old English evidence, a spelling "Eihaz" would be more proper.

Following the convention of Wolfgang Krause, the rune's standard transliteration today is ï, though this designation is somewhat arbitrary as the rune's purpose and origin is still not well understood. Elmer Antonsen and Leo Connolly theorized that the rune originally stood for a Proto-Germanic vowel lost by the time of the earliest known runic inscriptions, though they put forth different vowels (Antonsen put forth  while Connolly put forth ). Ottar Grønvik proposed .

The rune survives in the Anglo-Saxon futhorc as  Ēoh or Īh "yew" (note that ᛖ eoh "horse" has a short diphthong). As a vowel, Ēoh shows up in jïslheard (ᛡᛇᛋᛚᚻᛠᚱᛞ) on the Dover Stone. As a consonant, Ēoh shows up in almeïttig (ᚪᛚᛗᛖᛇᛏᛏᛁᚷ) on the Ruthwell Cross.

The Anglo-Saxon rune poem reads:

 Eoh byþ utan unsmeþe treoƿ,
   heard hrusan fæst, hyrde fyres,
   ƿyrtrumun underƿreþyd, ƿyn on eþle.

 The yew is a tree with rough bark,
   hard and fast in the earth, supported by its roots,
   a guardian of flame and a joy on native land.

See also
Wolfsangel, similar shape to the Eihwaz rune

References

Runes